James Armstrong may refer to:

Politics
 James Armstrong (North Carolina politician) (died 1794), American Revolutionary War officer and politician
 James Armstrong (Georgia politician) (1728–1800), Georgia politician and candidate in the United States presidential election of 1789
 James Armstrong (Pennsylvania politician) (1748–1828), American Revolutionary War physician, United States congressman
 James Rogers Armstrong (1787–1873), manufacturer and political figure in Upper Canada
 James Armstrong (Texas politician) (1811–1879), member of the Second Texas Legislature
 James Armstrong (Ontario politician) (1830–1893), Canadian MP from Ontario
 James William Armstrong (1860–1928), Canadian politician from Manitoba

Sport
 James Armstrong (Scottish footballer) (1887–1915), Scottish footballer
 James Armstrong (American soccer) (died 1952), American soccer player and coach, in National Soccer Hall of Fame
 James Armstrong (footballer, born 1892) (1892–1966), English footballer

Other fields
 James Francis Armstrong (1750–1816), American Revolutionary War chaplain, New Jersey Presbyterian 
 James Armstrong (Unitarian minister) (1780–1839), Irish Unitarian minister
 James Armstrong (naval officer) (1794–1868), American naval officer in the Civil War
 James Sherrard Armstrong (1821–1888), Canadian lawyer and British colonial jurist
 James Isbell Armstrong (1919–2013), American academic, president of Middlebury College
 James Armstrong (engineer) (1926–2010), British structural engineer
 James Armstrong (musician) (born 1957), American blues guitarist and singer

See also
 Jim Armstrong (disambiguation), for those known as Jim or Jimmy
 Arthur James Armstrong (1924–2018), bishop of the United Methodist Church